Nyanduma is a settlement in Kenya's Central Province.
Nyanduma is in Lari Constituency in Kiambu County with a population of 23, 454. Nyanduma Ward is made up of Nyanduma, Gachoire and Kagwe sub locations.

References 

Populated places in Central Province (Kenya)